Parhul Devi Temple is a temple to the Goddess Durga in the village of Lamahra in Kanpur Dehat district, Uttar Pradesh, India.

Location
Its nearest railway station is Rura North Central Railway. Bus and taxi are available from Rura to Parhul Devi Temple.

History

Goddess Parhul and Lord Mahadev were found in the temple complex by King Singha of Parhu state in the 12th century. Parhul Devi is mentioned in Parmal Raso (Aalh Khand). Warrior Alhaa built a golden light Kund in the campus of this temple to fulfill of desire for victory in battle. The light of this golden Jyoti Kund reached to the Kannauj palace. The Queen of Kannauj (Padma) was disturbed while sleeping due to the light of golden Kund of the Parhul temple. So, warrior Udal threw it into the River Rind.

Sculptures in temple

Parul Devi

Parhul devi is sitting under a northern dome of the temple complex. Three images of Goddesses, indicative of ancient artwork, are engraved on a stone.

Mahadev 
Lord Mahadev is sitting under a southern dome of the temple complex. Both the dome of Parhul Devi and Shri Mahadev are identical in shape and size.

Fair
The fair is held here during Basanti Navratri in the month of Chaitra and during Shardiya Navratri in the month of Ashwin of the Hindu calendar every year. The fair starts on the first day of Navratri, meaning from Pratipada and ends on Durga Ashtami.

Gallery

References

Devi temples in India
Kanpur Dehat district
Hindu temples in Uttar Pradesh